Chenkal is a village in Thiruvananthapuram district in the state of Kerala, India. Until the land-reforms ordinance enacted by the Communist regime in the 1950s, the village formed part of the estate of the jenmi (Yejamanan) of Kandamath. The ramparts of the medieval Kandamath Palace (Kandamath Madom Thampuran Vaka) and the ruins can still be seen in the area. Maheshwaram Shiva Parvathi temple, which houses the tallest Shiva lingam in the world, having a height of 111 ft, is located in this village.

Demographics
 India census, Chenkal had a population of 35992 with 17825 males and 18167 females.

References

Villages in Thiruvananthapuram district